The Cologne University of Music ( is a music college in Cologne, Germany. Founded in 1850, it is Europe's largest academy of music.

History
The academy was founded by Ferdinand Hiller in 1850 as Conservatorium der Musik in Coeln. In 1895 German violinist Willy Hess was appointed as principal professor of violin at the Conservatorium der Musik in Coeln.

In 1925 it became known as the Staatliche Hochschule für Musik having introduced new study and exam regulations.

In 1972 it incorporated previously independent conservatories in Aachen and Wuppertal, forming  the Staatliche Hochschule für Musik Rheinland which in 1987 changed its name to Hochschule für Musik Köln or the Cologne University of Music.

Alumni

 Theo Altmeyer
 Jürg Baur
 Heribert Beissel
 Elena Braslavsky
 Jan Chiapusso
 Michael Denhoff
 Allard de Ridder
 Sir Vivian Dunn
 Juan Carlos Echeverry Bernal
 Mojca Erdmann
 Henry Fairs
 Hedwig Fassbender
 Achim Fiedler
 Christopher Fifield
 Johannes Fritsch
 Mechthild Georg
 Reinhard Goebel
 Georg Hajdu
 Liselotte Hammes
 Anja Harteros
 York Höller
 Engelbert Humperdinck
 Hedy Iracema-Brügelmann
 Johannes Kalitzke
 Volker David Kirchner
 Hans Knappertsbusch
 Akil Mark Koci
 Karlrobert Kreiten
 Carl Lachmund
 Jin Sang Lee
 Thomas Lehn
 Mesias Maiguashca
 Willem Mengelberg
 Karl Aagard Østvig
 Luis Fernando Pérez
 Adolph Schellschmidt
 Olga Scheps
 Steffen Schleiermacher
 Else Schmitz-Gohr (composer)
 Michael Schneider (flautist)
 Johannes Schröder
 Wilhelm Schüchter
 Juan Maria Solare
 Caroline Stein
 Markus Stenz
 Karlheinz Stockhausen
 Wolfgang Stockmeier
 Zoran Dukic
 Chris Walden
 Graham Waterhouse
 Eberhard Werdin
 Soyoung Yoon
 Bernd Alois Zimmermann
 Goran Krivokapić
 Lili Wieruszowski
 Bruno Vlahek

Lecturers

 Pierre-Laurent Aimard
 Zakhar Bron
 Marcus Creed
 Liselotte Hammes
 York Höller
 Konrad Junghänel
 Klesie Kelly
 Maria Kliegel
 Vassily Lobanov
 Florence Millet
 Jono Podmore
 Edda Moser
 Christoph Prégardien
 Zoran Dukic

Former lecturers

 Hermann Abendroth
 András Adorján
 Amadeus Quartet
 Jürg Baur
 Erling Blöndal Bengtsson
 Walter Braunfels
 Herbert Eimert
 Maurits Frank
 Johannes Fritsch
 Clemens Ganz
 Vinko Globokar
 Hans Werner Henze
 Willy Hess (violinist)
 Philipp Jarnach
 Adolf Jensen
 Mauricio Kagel
 Aloys and Alfons Kontarsky
 Günter Ludwig
 Frank Martin
 Josef Metternich
 Krzysztof Meyer
 August von Othegraven
 Siegfried Palm
 Carl Reinecke
 Max Rostal
 Heinrich Schiff
 Hermann Schroeder
 Isidor Seiss
 Karlheinz Stockhausen
 Wolfgang Stockmeier
 Volker Wangenheim
 Erich Wenk
 Jiggs Whigham
 Franz Wüllner
 Bernd Alois Zimmermann

(List is mixed)

See also
Music schools in Germany

References

External links
Hochschule für Musik und Tanz Köln

 
Music schools in Germany
Innenstadt, Cologne
Educational institutions established in 1850
1850 establishments in Prussia
1850 establishments in Germany
Universities and colleges in Cologne